Guillermo Maldonado may refer to: 

Guillermo Maldonado (pastor), founder of El Rey Jesús
Guillermo Maldonado (racing driver), Argentine racing driver